National Highway 157, commonly referred to as NH 157 is a national highway in  India. It is a spur road of National Highway 57. NH-157 traverses the state of Odisha in India.

Route 
Purunakatak, Phulbani, Kalinga, Bhanjanagar, Asika.

Junctions  

  Terminal near Purunakatak.
  Terminal near Asika.

See also 

 List of National Highways in India
 List of National Highways in India by state

References

External links 

 NH 157 on OpenStreetMap

National highways in India
National Highways in Odisha